Souk El Koutbiya is one of the souks in the medina of Tunis. It is specialized in the selling of books.

Location 
This souk is located in the proximity of the Al-Zaytuna Mosque, near Souk El Fekka.

It is delimited by Souk El Kachachine.

History 
Souk El Koutbiya was established by Abu l-Hasan Ali I between 1750 and 1755.

At the same time, Madrasa Slimania and Madrasa El Bachia were built.

References 

Koutbiya
Bookstore neighborhoods